"" is a song by Swedish singer Victor Leksell, released as a single from his debut album,  (2020). "Svag" was written by Leksell along with Carl Silvergran, Felix Flygare Floderer, Kevin Högdahl, and Niklas Carson Mattsson, and produced by Silvergran, Floderer, and Mattsson. According to Leksell, the song expresses the feeling of having one's breath taken away while in the presence of a love interest.

In Sweden, "Svag" debuted at number-one on the singles chart and stayed atop for 14 non-consecutive weeks; it has subsequently been certified nonuple platinum by the Swedish Recording Industry Association. The song also topped the singles chart in Norway and has reached the top 20 in Denmark, where it has been certified platinum. Leksell and Norwegian singer Astrid S performed "Svag" on the Svinesund Bridge on the Norway–Sweden border; the duet was performed in the singers' respective languages of Swedish and Norwegian. Due to the song's success in the Nordic countries, Leksell was awarded the 2020  by Föreningen Norden for breaking down linguistic barriers. In October 2020, "Svag" became the most-streamed Swedish-language song on Spotify, accruing over 100 million streams. As of March 2021, it has been streamed over 130 million times.

It was also awarded the 2020 Svensktoppen award for Song of the Year. Additionally, "Svag" won Song of the Year at the 2021 Grammis.

Charts

Weekly charts

Year-end charts

Certifications

See also
 List of number-one singles of 2020 (Norway)
 List of number-one singles of 2020 (Sweden)

References

2020 singles
2020 songs
Number-one singles in Norway
Number-one singles in Sweden
Sony Music singles
Swedish-language songs
Swedish pop songs